Governor's Cup is an academic tournament within the Commonwealth of Kentucky.

Participation

Governor's Cup involves approximately 20,000 students. The following chart depicts the membership fees of each grade level:

Operation

The participants of this challenge are organized into three separate grade divisions. These divisions are Elementary School, Middle School, and High School.

Elementary School division

The Elementary School division of Governor's Cup allows students enrolled in fourth and fifth grades to compete against one another in District and Regional competitions.

Middle School division

The Middle School division of Governor's Cup allows students enrolled in the sixth through eighth grades compete against one another in District, Regional, and State competitions.

High School division

The High School division of Governor's Cup allows students enrolled in the ninth through twelfth grades to compete against one another in District, Regional, and State competitions.

Competition

In the competition there are three basic levels: District (the first level and where a group of schools compete), Region (the top five testing students and the top two quick recall and future problem solving teams from each district), and State (the top five testing students and the top two quick recall and future problem solving teams from each region).  The categories that a student and team can compete in are:

Individual: Written Assessments (Language Arts, Mathematics, Science, Arts and Humanities, Social Studies, and Written Composition).

Team: Quick Recall (two teams of four students each compete against each other to answer questions the quickest and correctly) and Future Problem Solving (teams of four that try to find the best solution to a problem that might arise).

State champions

See also
 Quick Recall

References
 Governor's Cup. Kentucky Association For Academic Competition.

External links
 Kentucky Association For Academic Competition

Education in Kentucky
Student quiz competitions